Basil Brush is a fictional red fox, best known for his appearances on daytime British children's television. He is primarily portrayed by a glove puppet, but has also been depicted in animated cartoon shorts and comic strips. The character has featured on children's television from the 1960s to the present day. He has also appeared in pantomimes across the UK.

A mischievous character and a raconteur, Basil Brush is best known for his catchphrase "Ha Ha Ha! Boom! Boom!", used after something he finds funny, and also for speaking in a "posh" accent and manner, referring to himself as a "fella". The character claims to dislike puppets, and says his most prized possession is his brush, this being the traditional name for a fox's tail. The character of Basil Brush publicly supports Leicester City Football Club, which he refers to as "the foxes".

1962 to 1968

The original Basil Brush glove puppet was designed by Peter Firmin in 1962 for an ITV television series, and was voiced and performed by Ivan Owen until his death in October 2000.

Ivan Owen took great care to ensure that he, personally, never received any publicity. Professionally, only Basil had a public persona, with Owen himself remaining entirely unknown. This helped give the character believability, making Basil appear to be real, since—unlike Harry Corbett and Sooty, for example—the audience never saw the puppeteer. Owen modelled Basil's voice on the actor Terry-Thomas, giving the puppet a touch of well-cultivated class.

Basil first appeared on television in 1962, in a series called The Three Scampies, a story of an out-of-work circus act. The human was Howard Williams, Ivan Owen animated and voiced Basil and Wally Whyton animated and voiced Spike McPike, a very aggressive Scottish hedgehog also made by Peter Firmin.

In the mid-1960s Basil became a supporting act for the magician David Nixon, upstaging Nixon on the latter's BBC1 show Nixon at Nine-Five in 1967 and The Nixon Line (1967–68), to such good effect that Basil was offered his own show.

The Basil Brush Show from 1968 to 1980

The Basil Brush Show ran for 12 years from 1968 until 1980, in which he was supported by various famous stooges: first, in 1968, by the actor Rodney Bewes, known on the show as "Mr Rodney"; next, from 1969 to 1973, by the actor Derek Fowlds (known as "Mr Derek"); then until 1976 by actor and singer Roy North ("Mr Roy"); then by "Mr Howard" Howard Williams, who was in the original "Three Scampies"; and finally by "Mr Billy" (Billy Boyle). By the mid-1970s the show was aimed at a family audience, so was usually broadcast on BBC1 in an early evening timeslot on Saturdays. This, plus a degree of sophistication in the humour (which often included topical political jokes) helped give Basil a broad mainstream appeal.

The show was recorded with a studio audience, and usually ran about 25 minutes. The format typically featured an introduction by Basil and his stooge (Mr Rodney, Mr Derek, etc.), in which they would do a few jokes; this was followed by a comedy sketch, featuring topical jokes about a then-current subject (for instance, a sketch set on board an aeroplane flying them to a holiday in Spain, loosely based around the hit pop song Eviva España); then a musical item, featuring a guest singer or group (these included some of the best known singers of the day, top stars such as Demis Roussos in 1973, Petula Clark in 1979, and Cilla Black — big stars vied to get on the show, which had a large audience); sometimes the guest singer would do a song straight, but then also do a comic duet with Basil.

Finally, the show would conclude with 'storytime', in which the straight man would read aloud from a serial story about the adventures of some fictitious historical relative of Basil's – for instance 'Bulldog' Basil, or Blast-Off Basil and his journey to the stars (a Star Trek spoof), or Basil de Farmer, the knight in shining armour (a Robin Hood spoof); or at least he would attempt to, whilst being continually interrupted by a string of jokes and humorous remarks (often concerning "Dirty Gertie from Number Thirty") from Basil. At this point, in the mid-1970s, Basil would often get out Little Ticker, his clockwork wind-up dog, and have it do humorous tricks at the side, almost off-camera, in order to distract the audience and thereby take the rise out of Mr Roy. Each week's story ended on a cliffhanger and the catchphrase "and that's all we've got time for this week, Basil", followed by protestations from Basil which would lead into a final song, based upon that week's serial story, whilst the closing credits rolled.

1980s
A dispute in 1980 led to the show's cancellation. Ivan Owen aspired to a mid-evening timeslot, to which the BBC were unwilling to agree. In 1982, the puppet reappeared on television in Let's Read With Basil Brush, an infant schools programme on ITV produced by Granada Television. Basil eventually returned to the BBC, as co-host of the long-running children's television series Crackerjack, broadcast at 4:55pm on Fridays, during the 1983–84 season.

Basil Brush also performed in the theatre, regularly appearing live in Pantomime at Christmas; usually co-starring at the top of the bill with a well-known singer or comedian. His pantomime co-stars during the 1960s included the singer Cilla Black. After the television show's cancellation in 1980, Basil ended his partnership with Mr Billy and teamed up once again with Howard Williams ("Mr Howard"); they toured in a live stage show, capitalising on Basil's celebrity and continuing popularity as a result of thirteen years on TV.

During this period Basil also featured in his own cartoon strip in the children's publication TV Comic, published weekly in Britain by Polystyle Publications.

2000s Relaunch

In September 1997, Ivan Owen and Peter Firmin sold the rights to Basil Brush to Bill Haslam, a Cornwall-based businessman and a longtime fan of the character. Haslam formed a Southampton-based company called "Boom! Boom!" with the aim of relaunching Basil Brush with a new television series and public appearances.

After Haslam's attempts at relaunching Basil went to little avail, leading to a £55,000 loss, he sold Boom! Boom! to children's media company SKD Media (later Entertainment Rights) in July 1999, and joined SKD in help to relaunch the property with a new television series. In August 2000, Entertainment Rights announced a new six-episode sitcom series titled Foxed, in co-production with Talent Television, and was in talks with both BBC and ITV for the series' pre-sale. After a toy-deal with Hasbro was confirmed, the series was retooled and became The Basil Brush Show, which in January 2002 was announced to air on the CBBC Channel in the Autumn. However, the series would instead be co-produced with The Foundation.

The series, while still maintaining the faithfulness of the original series, was in the format of a children's sitcom that took place in a flat. Basil who is now performed and voiced by Michael Winsor was joined by a new comic foil, Mr Stephen, played by Christopher Pizzey, who was later replaced with his Northern Irish cousin Liam (Michael Byers) in 2006. Two new child friends - the moneymaking child Dave (Michael Hayes) and the more sensible Molly (Georgina Leonidas),  in addition to other characters like Madison, who lived upstairs, and Anil, a crazy café owner and inept cook. Anil's niece, Lucy (Janine Vieira in Season 5 and Madeline Castrey in Season 6), appeared in the last two seasons in place of Molly as the female child friend of Basil. Basil Brush now had a family, which included his destructive, hyperactive but cute nephew Bingo, and his criminal cousin Mortimer. Several personalities made cameo appearances on the show. These included Eamonn Holmes and Ainsley Harriott.

The original shows were recorded before a studio audience, composed mainly of children, but the new programme used a post-production laughter track instead of an audience. Interspersed with the main programme, there were animated shorts in which Basil and/or another character is seen making jokes. The more recent puppet looks different from the original 1960s/1970s puppet in a number of aspects and, apart from being well-spoken, the voice of Basil is very different from the original Ivan Owen version. Basil Brush often breaks the fourth wall by having shots of the set and making references to how long the show is, and abusing the obvious way of walking across to other scenes.

Preservation
The British Film Institute in November 2016 announced The Basil Brush Show would be digitised as part of the BFI's five-year strategy for 2017–2022 to preserve programmes from the 1970s and 80s. Many of the tapes at the BFI's Conservation Centre in Hertfordshire were reportedly deteriorating and at risk of becoming unplayable.

Other appearances

Basil's Cartoon Story Book

Basil's Cartoon Story Book is a collection of 24 animated children's stories from around the world and presented by Basil Brush. Released on VHS in 1994, it was sold and distributed in the United Kingdom by PolyGram Video Ltd under The Pocket Money Video brand.

The Goodies

Basil appears in two episodes of The Goodies. In A Kick in the Arts, he cameos in a fox hunting scene. In The Goodies Rule – O.K.?, he is a member of the "Puppet Government".

Stick It Out

Basil appears on the 1993 Comic Relief song "Stick It Out" with Right Said Fred and other celebrity friends.

Fantasy Football League

Also in 1993, Basil appeared alongside Roy Hattersley on the BBC comedy series Fantasy Football League with Frank Skinner and David Baddiel, it was his first television appearance in a decade. His fantasy football team for the series included Norwich City midfielder Ruel Fox.

Blue Peter

Basil briefly appeared as a presenter for several Friday episodes of the popular British children's TV programme Blue Peter in 2003, in which he had his own joke segment. On 16 November 2010, Basil made a further guest appearance for one episode.

French and Saunders

Basil played Dobby the house elf in the French & Saunders sketch "Harry Potter and the Secret Chamberpot of Azerbaijan" for Comic Relief Red Nose Day 2003.

500 miles

Basil has a cameo among the group of celebs observing Brian Potter and Andy Pipkin for the Comic Relief single "I would roll 500 miles".

The Weakest Link

On 10 December 2005 Basil appeared on The Weakest Link and won the show, receiving £10,900 for his chosen charity, the Blue Peter 2005 charity appeal, "Treasure Trail" (in aid of Childline). This makes him the first puppet to win The Weakest Link (Roland Rat had previously appeared as a puppet contestant, but did not win).

Basil returned to The Weakest Link as one of the contestants on the show's 1000th UK edition, recorded on 1 November 2006 and aired on BBC Two on 18 December 2006. Although he made it to the final round, this time he failed to win. However, the winner (Miss Evans) still decided to share half of her winnings with Basil's chosen charity. Although Basil is a puppet, he did not appear in the puppet special that aired the following year.

Cinderella

Basil Brush starred in the Christmas pantomime Cinderella in 2007, including St Albans, where he would appear from a large box on wheels for various hilarious off-plot moments, and encouraged children in the audience to shout 'Boom Boom Basil!' after each use of his catchphrase. In December 2010, Basil appeared in the Croydon Fairfield Halls pantomime production of Cinderella.

Bruce Forsyth's Generation Game 
Basil made a surprise guest appearance at the end of an act featured on the BBC game show The Generation Game in about 1973, where the game between the players was to identify six celebrities hidden behind disguises who sang a song about a dastardly plot to blow up the Houses of Parliament. Both teams of contestants identified Basil as one of the masked celebrities.

Jim Davidson's Generation Game 
Basil made another surprise guest appearance once again featured on Jim Davidson's version of the BBC game show The Generation Game on 30 December 2000 when he met Jim Davidson and a contestant Sue, telling them a rabbit joke. This appearance marked the first time that Michael Winsor plays the role of Basil Brush.

Basil's Swap Shop

On 20 December 2007 the BBC announced that Basil would be co-presenting a new version of Swap Shop with Barney Harwood on BBC Two. The new series is titled Basil's Swap Shop.

Talkin' 'Bout Your Generation

In February 2010 Basil Brush appeared on the Australian game show Talkin' 'Bout Your Generation in episode one of season two as the show's first international guest. He appeared in the Baby Boomer team.

Aladdin

Basil Brush starred alongside Debra Stephenson, Malcolm Lord and the Harper Brothers in Aladdin at the Regent Theatre, Ipswich.

Mongrels

In July 2010 a Holocaust denier Fox referred to as "Basil" appeared on the "adult puppet show" Mongrels in a throwaway gag scene (Never meet your idols).

Rolf Harris at The Royal Albert Hall

Basil appeared with Rolf Harris at his 50th-anniversary concert for The Prince's Trust. Basil criticised Rolf about wanting to tie a kangaroo down, leading to a montage of clips from Animal Hospital, then they performed a duet of the song 'In The Court of King Caractacus' together.

Celebrity Juice

Basil was the Newerer Magazine headline in the Celebrity Juice Series 6 Christmas special.

ITV News

On 21 December 2012, Basil appeared on the show ITV News as part of the "Text Santa" charity event.

Let's Dance for Comic Relief

On 2 March 2013, Basil appeared in the third episode of the 2013 series.

Beauty and the Beast

Between 3 December 2014 and 11 January 2015, Basil starred in Beauty and the Beast at the Theatre Royal in Windsor.

Good Morning Britain

On 2 March 2015, Basil appeared on Good Morning Britain talking about his tour around the United Kingdom. On 5 April 2018, Basil became the Guest Entertainment Editor.

Pointless Celebrities

On 12 September 2015 and 29 May 2016, Basil appeared on Pointless Celebrities in episodes featuring children's TV presenters.

The Last Leg

On 11 November 2016, Basil appeared on The Last Leg to considerable public adulation. On 23 December 2016, by popular demand, Basil appeared on the Christmas special. He also appeared via a Zoom call on 26 February 2021 under the pretext to discuss giving secret messages in his programmes in the '60s and '70s. On 28 January 2022, he reappeared for a short cameo as a temporary host in reference to Russia perhaps invading Ukraine and appointing a "puppet" leader.

The Chase: Celebrity Special

On 10 December 2017, Basil appeared on The Chase.

He earned £8,000 in his Cash Builder, which he banked for the team by winning his head-to-head Chase with Jenny "The Vixen" Ryan. In the Final Chase, he teamed up with Sam Quek and Charlie Higson to defeat the Vixen and win £7,666.66 (1/3 of £23,000) for charity.

Basil returned to the Chase on 28 August 2022 (Series 13, Episode 1) with Sunetra Sarker, Matty Lee, and David Arnold. Basil earned £3,000 to complete a full house for the Final Chase against Darragh Ennis for £19,000. The team beat Ennis with each celebrity taking £4,750 home for their charities.

The Generation Game

It was revealed that Basil starred in the revamped version of The Generation Game alongside Mel Giedroyc and Sue Perkins when it returned in Spring 2018 on BBC 1.

Strictly Come Dancing: It Takes Two

On 16 November 2018, Basil appeared on Strictly Come Dancing: It Takes Two alongside Alexandra Burke, Jamie Cullum and Rob Deering as a part of the Friday Panel. He revealed that his favourite dance is the Foxtrot.

Dick Whittington

Basil appeared in Dick Whittington at the Theatre Royal in Windsor which ran from 23 November 2018 to 6 January 2019.

Cinderella

In 2020 Basil appeared in Cinderella at the Theatre Royal in Windsor which ran from 3 December 2020 to 10 January 2021

Hypothetical 
In 2021, Basil appeared on the first episode of the third season of Hypothetical as one of the celebrities in the 'Wall of Celebrities' segment.

QI 
Basil appeared on QI for their 'T' series show themed around television on 25 November 2022 (in recognition of the BBC's 100th birthday). Basil managed to score minus 20 points having triggered the klaxon twice. Sandi Toksvig incorrectly introduced Basil as a dog, but was duly corrected.

See also
Entertainment Rights
CBBC Channel
CBBC
List of BBC children's television programmes

References

External links

 Official Basil Brush website
 BBC website on Basil Brush
 British Film Institute Screen Online
 Ivan Owen Obituary – The Guardian

Television characters introduced in 1962
Television series about foxes
Children's comedy television series
British television shows featuring puppetry
British comedy puppets
Anthropomorphic foxes

es:El Show de Basil Brush
pt:The Basil Brush Show